The 1969–70 Miami Floridians season was the second season of the Miami Floridians in the American Basketball Association. The team notably tried gimmicks to attract fans. November 5th's game would be Ladies Night, with free honey colored pantyhose (originally $2 value) given to the first 500 ladies, provided it fit anyone from 5 feet to 5 feet, 9 inches in size, with nothing extra needed to buy. For the November 10th game, if one bought a ticket (for $5), they would be allowed to walk to the Auditorium to see Jimmy Ellis (who had just lost the World Heavyweight title to Joe Frazier) box Roberto Davila, with the fight being after the game. The team faltered to a dead last finish, with constant trades and scant profits. Ned Doyle, an advertising executive became majority owner of the team, and he decided to make the team a regional franchise, named the Floridians, playing in Miami Beach, Jacksonville, Tampa-St. Petersburg and West Palm Beach.

Roster
 23 Andrew Anderson - Shooting guard 
 41 Butch Booker - Center 
 22 Walter Byrd - Power forward 
 30 Larry Cannon - Shooting guard 
 42 Al Cueto - Center 
 20 Donnie Freeman - Point guard 
 32 Art Heyman - Shooting guard 
 34 Simmie Hill - Small forward 
 14 Wil Jones - Power forward 
 26 George Lehmann	 - Point guard 
 22 Maurice McHartley - Point guard 
 44 Willie Murrell - Small forward 
 23 Lynn Shackelford	- Small forward 
 33 Donald Sidle - Power forward 
 32 Daniel Sparks - Power forward 
 24 Erv Staggs - Small forward 
 43 George Sutor - Center 
 43 Skip Thoren - Center 
 34 Dallas Thornton - Small forward 
 22 Stephen Vacendak - Point guard 
 32 Hubie White - Shooting guard 
 -- Bob Woollard - Center

Final standings

Eastern Division

Awards and honors
1970 ABA All-Star Game selections (game played on January 24, 1970)
 Donnie Freeman

References

 Floridians on Basketball Reference

External links
 RememberTheABA.com 1969-70 regular season and playoff results
 Miami Floridians page

Miami Floridians seasons
Miami
Miami Floridians, 1969-70
Miami Floridians, 1969-70